The African Finance Journal is a peer-reviewed academic journal covering finance, accounting, and economics in an African context. The African Finance Journal (AFJ)  is published twice a year and edited at Africagrowth Institute. The Journal is jointly published by the Institute, University of Cape Town and the African Finance Association. AFJ publishes significant new research in finance, accounting and economics relevant to Africa and strives to establish a balance between theoretical and empirical studies.

The journal is accredited by the South African National Department of Education for the purpose of research subsidy.

Abstract, Indexing and Ranking 
EconLit
Scopus
RePec
IBSS
Sabinet
Chartered Association of Business Schools (CABS)

References

External links 
 

Finance journals
Publications established in 1999
Biannual journals
English-language journals
1999 establishments in South Africa